Marc Jacobs (born April 9, 1963) is an American fashion designer. He is the head designer for his own fashion label, Marc Jacobs, and formerly Marc by Marc Jacobs, a diffusion line, which was produced for approximately 15 years, before it was discontinued after the 2015 fall/winter collection. At its peak, it had over 200 retail stores in 80 countries.  He was the creative director of the French design house Louis Vuitton from 1997 to 2014. Jacobs was on Time magazine's "2010 Time 100" list of the 100 most influential people in the world, and was #14 on Out magazine's 2012 list of "50 Most Powerful Gay Men and Women in America". He married his longtime partner Charly Defrancesco on April 6, 2019.

Early life and education
Jacobs was born to a non-observant Jewish family in New York City. When he was seven, his father, an agent at the William Morris Agency, died. His mother, who remarried three times, was, according to Jacobs, "mentally ill" and "didn't really take care of her kids." As a teenager, he went to live with his paternal grandmother on the Upper West Side, in an apartment in the Majestic on Central Park West.

Jacobs grew up in Teaneck, New Jersey and attended Teaneck High School.

He attended the High School of Art and Design and studied at Parsons School of Design in New York. While at Parsons in 1984, he won the Perry Ellis & Chester Weinberg Gold Thimble Award, and Design Student of the Year. In 1987, he became the youngest designer ever to receive the Council of Fashion Designers of America's Perry Ellis Award for New Fashion Talent. He also won the Women's Designer of the Year award from the Council of Fashion Designers of America in 1993.

Career
At age 15, Jacobs worked as a stockboy at Charivari, a now-defunct avant-garde clothing boutique in New York City. While studying at Parsons, he designed and sold his first line of hand-knit sweaters. He also designed his first collection for Reuben Thomas, Inc., under the Sketchbook label. With Robert Duffy, Jacobs's creative collaborator and business partner from the mid-1980s, he formed Jacobs Duffy Designs.

In 1986, backed by Onward Kashiyama USA, Inc., Jacobs designed his first collection bearing the Marc Jacobs label. In 1987, he was the youngest designer to have ever been awarded the fashion industry's highest tribute, the Council of Fashion Designers of America's Perry Ellis Award for "New Fashion Talent". In 1988, Jacobs and Duffy joined the women's design unit of Perry Ellis as creative director/vice president and president, respectively, following the death of its namesake and founder. In addition, Jacobs oversaw the design of the various women's licensees. In 1992, the Council of Fashion Designers of America awarded Jacobs with The Women's Designer of the Year Award. In the same year, he designed a "grunge" collection for Perry Ellis, which led to his dismissal.

In fall 1993, Jacobs Duffy Designs Inc. launched their own licensing and design company, Marc Jacobs International Company, L.P. In 1994, Jacobs produced his first full collection of menswear. In 1997, Jacobs was appointed Louis Vuitton's creative director, where he created the company's first ready-to-wear clothing line. Jacobs collaborated with many popular artists for his Louis Vuitton collections, including Stephen Sprouse, Takashi Murakami, Richard Prince, and Kanye West.

In spring 2001, Jacobs introduced his secondary line, Marc by Marc Jacobs. In 2005, Look was the Marc by Marc Jacobs ready-to-wear license holder in Japan with retail value of €50 million. In 2006, Jacobs started a new line of body-splash fragrances in ten-ounce bottles which were distributed by Coty. In 2007, filmmaker Loïc Prigent released a documentary film about Jacobs entitled Marc Jacobs and Louis Vuitton. In 2007, Jacobs released his popular Daisy collection of perfumes. 

In February 2008, Jacobs was accused of plagiarizing a scarf design created in the 1950s by Swedish designer Gösta Olofsson. Jacobs settled the matter by offering monetary compensation to Olofsson's son. In 2009, Jacobs launched a shirt, sold at his stores, demanding the legalization of gay marriage. In May 2009, Jacobs co-hosted, with model Kate Moss, a "model and muse"-themed gala for the New York City Metropolitan Museum of Art's Costume Institute.  In February 2010, Jacobs sued Ed Hardy for infringing on the designs of one of his embroidered handbags. 

In the course of the Mercedes-Benz Berlin Fashion Week in July 2011 Jacobs was the patron of the young talent award "Designer for Tomorrow by Peek & Cloppenburg". The five finalists were selected by Jacob and the jury board and received personal coaching by Jacobs. The jury board and Jacobs appointed the winner of 2011 during the DfT award show. In August 2011, it was reported that Jacobs might succeed John Galliano as creative director of Christian Dior. According to The Daily Telegraph, Jacobs "firmly laid to rest rumours that he was to move to Christian Dior" in January 2012, but rumors prevailed.

Jacobs made his feature film acting debut in Disconnect (2012), directed by Henry-Alex Rubin and starring Jason Bateman, Paula Patton, Alexander Skarsgård and Andrea Riseborough. His character, Harvey, runs a house of teenage Internet porn performers, which is being investigated by a TV reporter, played by Riseborough.

In February 2013, Jacobs was named the new creative director for Diet Coke. In honor of the brand's 30th anniversary, Jacobs spent a year giving the brand a "stylish and light-hearted" makeover. In March 2013, the New York Daily News revealed that the "faux fur" used in many Marc Jacobs garments is actually the fur from raccoon dogs from China.

In October 2013, after the Spring/Summer 2014 show, it was revealed that Marc Jacobs would leave Louis Vuitton to focus on his own line.

On January 9, 2014, it was announced that Jacobs's new Spring/Summer collection would feature actress/singer Miley Cyrus, photographed by David Sims.

On February 26, 2014, it was announced that actress Jessica Lange would be the new face of Marc Jacobs Beauty. In addition, it was announced that Lange would be featured in the brand's Summer/Fall print-ad campaign photographed by David Sims, and would also star in a short campaign film directed by Jacobs, to start streaming online May 5, 2014. Previously, Jacobs had dressed and interviewed Lange for Love Magazines fifth anniversary issue, and had her provide a spoken-word version of "Happy Days Are Here Again" as the soundtrack for his Autumn/Winter 2014 show.

Jacobs decided to rely on social media to cast models for Marc by Marc Jacobs's Autumn/Winter 2014 campaign, and with its success did so again for Spring/Summer 2015 with photographer David Sims, with models including Aaron Whitty, Abigail Lipp, Amy Woodman, Ana Viktoria, Dylan Stevens, Eb Eunbi, Lindsay Lurgin, MacKenzie Cockerill, Nadia Kishlan, and Toks Adewetan.

In February 2018, LVMH confirmed that Baja East co-founder John Targon would join Marc Jacobs as "creative director of contemporary".

On August 26, 2019, Jacobs was presented with MTV's first "Fashion Trailblazer Award" at the Video Music Awards, in partnership with the Council of Fashion Designers of America.

In September 2020, Jacobs released Heaven, a polysexual line aimed at a younger audience while blurring gender boundaries.  All of the garments incorporated brand signatures to celebrate its history, while giving new context towards a newer, younger audience.  The campaign also featured young rising stars and trend-setters, such as beabadoobee and Iris Law.

Awards
CFDA Womenswear Designer of the Year, 2016
MTV Video Music Fashion Trailblazer Award, 2019

Stores

In summer 2013, there were 285 Marc Jacobs retail stores (including Marc by Marc Jacobs and Marc Jacobs Collection) in 60 countries. In December 2013, the new Marc Jacobs flagship store opened in Shanghai.

In March 2015, Jacobs announced the end of his secondary brand Marc by Marc Jacobs in order to focus on the development of his main label and to target to a more luxury-oriented audience.

Style

Explaining his clothes, Jacobs has said "what I prefer s that even if someone feels hedonistic, they don't look it. Curiosity about sex is much more interesting to me than domination... My clothes are not hot. Never. Never." The audience for his fashion shows typically includes celebrities such as Kim Gordon and Vincent Gallo. Guy Trebay, a critic for The New York Times, in response to Oscar de la Renta's comment that a coat designed by Jacobs closely resembled one that de la Renta had designed thirty years earlier, wrote that "unlike the many brand-name designers who promote the illusion that their output results from a single prodigious creativity, Mr. Jacobs makes no pretense that fashion emerges full blown from the head of one solitary genius". Jacobs was one of the first fashion designers to establish this "street wise aesthetics – a [mash up of] a little preppie, a little grunge, a little couture."

The Marc Jacobs brand has fine arts driven and avant-garde advertisement campaigns, often featuring a group of cultural icons and artists, in lieu of traditional fashion models in minimally staged settings and photographed by high-profile photographers. In 2015, Jacobs launched a popular lifestyle campaign that featured artists, celebrities, and cultural icons such as Sofia Coppola, Cher, Willow Smith, Winona Ryder, Daisy Lowe, and Anthony Kiedis.

Jacobs revisited this approach for the Marc Jacobs Spring 2016 advertising campaign, describing the concept as a fashion story representing a "series of connected events; a visual narrative. It is a personal diary of people who have and continue to inspire me and open my mind to different ways of seeing and thinking. The spectrum of individuals photographed in our Spring/Summer 2016 ad campaign represent a celebration of my America." He further added that "the people featured in our campaign personify this collection of fashion through their individuality. Collectively, they embody and celebrate the spirit and beauty of equality." The New York Observer called it "the best campaign of the Spring 2016 season," and that "the designer [Marc Jacobs] has handpicked a star-studded cast of his family members [people who are key to the Marc Jacobs brand] to model the Americana gear from this collection," thus making the collection notable. The Marc Jacobs Spring 2016 advertising campaign featured Lana Wachowski, Sandra Bernhard, Bette Midler, Juliette Lewis, Christina Ricci, Sky Ferreira, Bella Hadid, Emily Ratajkowski, Vincent Michaud, Oli Burslem, Milk, and several runway models.

Personal life and causes
Jacobs has an ongoing project entitled "Protect The Skin You're In", which has celebrities pose nude, with their breasts and frontal area covered, for T-shirts to raise awareness about melanoma; all sales benefit research at the NYU Langone Medical Center. Some of the celebrities that have posed are Miley Cyrus, Eva Mendes, Kate Upton, Victoria Beckham, Heidi Klum, Hilary Swank, Cara Delevingne, Debbie McGee, and Naomi Campbell.

On April 4, 2018, Jacobs proposed to his then-boyfriend, Charly Defrancesco, via a flash mob while in a Chipotle restaurant. The flash mob did a routine to the song "Kiss" by Prince. They were married in New York City on April 7, 2019.

The couple purchased a home in Rye, New York in April 2019. The Westchester home was designed by Frank Lloyd Wright and is known as the Max Hoffman House.

See also
LGBT culture in New York City
List of fashion designers
List of people from New York City
List of LGBT people from New York City

References

External links

 
 Marc Jacobs, 16 years with Louis Vuitton – Photo-Gallery

1963 births
Living people
American fashion designers
Artists from New York City
Businesspeople from New York City
Chevaliers of the Ordre des Arts et des Lettres
American companies established in 1984
Clothing companies established in 1984
High fashion brands
High School of Art and Design alumni
American LGBT businesspeople
LGBT fashion designers
LGBT people from New York (state)
LVMH people
Gay Jews
Jewish fashion designers
Parsons School of Design alumni
American cosmetics businesspeople
Teaneck High School alumni
20th-century American Jews
American people of Jewish descent
Gay businessmen
American gay artists
American fashion businesspeople
21st-century American Jews